Clinidium boroquense is a species of ground beetle in the subfamily Rhysodinae. It was described by R.T. Bell in 1970. It is endemic to Puerto Rico.

Clinidium boroquense measure  in length.

References

Clinidium
Beetles of the United States
Insects of Puerto Rico
Endemic fauna of Puerto Rico
Beetles described in 1970